Judge Thornton may refer to:

Michael B. Thornton (born 1954), judge of the United States Tax Court
Thomas Patrick Thornton (1898–1985), judge of the United States District Court for the Eastern District of Michigan

See also
Justice Thornton (disambiguation)